Zachary Lee Diles (born June 11, 1985) is a former American football linebacker. He was drafted by the Houston Texans in the seventh round of the 2007 NFL Draft. He played college football at Kansas State.

He was also a member of the St. Louis Rams, Tampa Bay Buccaneers, Indianapolis Colts, Kansas City Chiefs, and the Houston Texans.

Early years
Diles attended Tulare Union High School, but did not gain any post-season recognition in football.

College career
Diles was a two-year starter at Fresno City College in 2003 and 2004. He totaled 70 tackles in 2004 and 60 in 2003. In his two seasons the team had a 16-5 record and in 2004 Diles was named All.CVC

He finished his college career at Kansas State. He did not start in 2005 at Kansas State but still finished fourth on the team with 50 tackles (27 solos), adding two sacks, a pair of quarterback pressures, 5.5 stops behind the line of scrimmage and three forced fumbles. Diles earned honorable mention  All-Big 12 in 2006. He ranked second on the team and eighth in the conference with 99 tackles (38 solos) while starting all 13 games at middle linebacker. He added 3.5 sacks with two pressures and was credited with 7.5 stops for losses. He recovered one fumble, deflected two passes and intercepted another.

In 24 games at Kansas State, Diles started 13 contests. He produced 149 tackles (65 solos) with 5.5 sacks, 13 stops for losses and four pressures. He caused three fumbles, recovered another, knocked down two passes and had one interception.

Professional career

Pre-draft measurables

Houston Texans
Diles was selected in the 7th round of the 2007 NFL Draft. As a rookie in 2007 Diles played mostly on special teams. In 2008, he started 8 games as the Texans strong-side linebacker and made 66 tackles. In 2009, he moved to weakside linebacker and made 64 tackles and forced two fumbles. In 2010, he was again the starting weakside linebacker and totaled 81 tackles.

St. Louis Rams
He was signed to a free agent contract on July 29, 2011. He was released in the final cutdown after the fourth preseason game.

Tampa Bay Buccaneers
Diles signed with the Tampa Bay Buccaneers on September 4, 2011. He was cut on December 3, 2011.

Indianapolis Colts
The Indianapolis Colts claimed Diles off waivers on December 6. After playing in four games for the Colts in 2011, and recording two tackles, Diles was waived on February 7, 2012.

Tennessee Titans
Diles signed with the Tennessee Titans on May 1, 2012.

Kansas City Chiefs
On April 12, 2013, Diles signed with the Kansas City Chiefs. He was released before the season.

Second stint with Tennessee Titans
Diles signed with the Tennessee Titans on October 17, 2013. Diles was released by the Titans on December 3, 2013.

Cleveland Browns
Diles signed a contract with the Cleveland Browns after he worked out for them during their voluntary minicamp.

Second stint with the Houston Texans
Diles signed with the Houston Texans on October 28, 2014.

References

External links
Indianapolis Colts bio
Kansas State Wildcats bio

1985 births
Living people
Sportspeople from Abilene, Texas
Sportspeople from Tulare County, California
People from Tulare, California
American football linebackers
Cleveland Browns players
St. Louis Rams players
Fresno City Rams football players
Kansas State Wildcats football players
Houston Texans players
Tampa Bay Buccaneers players
Indianapolis Colts players
Tennessee Titans players
Kansas City Chiefs players
Players of American football from California
Ed Block Courage Award recipients